Fjeldsted is a surname.  Notable people with the surname include:

 Christian D. Fjeldsted (1829–1905), Danish general authority of the Church of Jesus Christ of Latter-day Saints
 Katrín Fjeldsted (born 1946), Icelandic politician and medical doctor
 Thorkild Fjeldsted (1740–1796), Icelandic lawyer